is a former Japanese football player.

Club statistics

References

External links

1988 births
Living people
Association football people from Chiba Prefecture
Japanese footballers
J2 League players
Thespakusatsu Gunma players
Association football forwards